The Right of Way is a lost 1915 silent film directed by John W. Noble and starring William Faversham. It is based on a 1907 play by Eugene Wiley Presbrey from the book by Sir Gilbert Parker. It was distributed by Metro Pictures. Faversham's motion picture debut.

The film was remade as The Right of Way in 1920 starring Bert Lytell.

Cast

References

External links

1915 films
American silent feature films
Lost American films
Films directed by John Noble
Films based on Canadian novels
Films based on works by Gilbert Parker
American black-and-white films
Metro Pictures films
1910s American films